Contact Point is a small rock headland close west of Sheppard Point on the north side of Hope Bay, Trinity Peninsula. The feature was first charted as an island by the Swedish Antarctic Expedition, 1901–04, but was surveyed by the Falkland Islands Dependencies Survey (FIDS) in 1955 and proved to be a point. It was so named by FIDS because greywacke, tuff and diorite were all found to be exposed on or very close to this point. Such contacts had not previously been recorded and they were important for the interpretation of the geology of the Tabarin Peninsula.

References
 

Headlands of Trinity Peninsula